"By the Blood" is a song by American rock band Drowning Pool. It was released as the lead single from the band's sixth studio album Hellelujah. The song also featured during the World Series of Fighting 25 on November 20, 2015.

Music video
A music video for the song was released on the band's official YouTube channel on December 18, 2015.

Charts

References

2015 songs
2015 singles
Drowning Pool songs